Kolbasa (or Colbasa) was a town of ancient Pisidia inhabited during Hellenistic, Roman and Byzantine times. 

Under the name Colbasa, it became a bishopric and remains a titular see of the Roman Catholic Church.

Its site is located near Kuşbaba, in Asiatic Turkey.

References

Populated places in Pisidia
Former populated places in Turkey
Roman towns and cities in Turkey
Populated places of the Byzantine Empire
History of Burdur Province
Catholic titular sees in Asia
Bucak District